The 1936–37 NHL season was the 20th season of the National Hockey League (NHL). Eight teams each played 48 games. The Detroit Red Wings were the Stanley Cup winners as they beat the New York Rangers three games to two in the final series.

League business
Frank Calder had been naming the top rookies commencing with 1932–33. This year, he commenced buying a trophy for the top rookie and Syl Apps was this year's winner.

The Great Depression continued to take its toll on the NHL. At the beginning of the decade there were ten teams and in the years since two teams had folded. It appeared like the New York Americans were to become the third team but the NHL took steps to prevent that from happening. Instead of letting the team cease operating because of money and ownership problems the league assumed control of the team for the 1936–37 season. It was then that team owner Bill Dwyer sued. A settlement then allowed for Dwyer to own the team, run by the NHL, and that Dwyer would be given a chance to pay back his debts.

The Montreal Maroons, short of money, had to sell their star and team captain Hooley Smith to Boston. It was hoped that Carl Voss of the former Eagles would fill in adequately for him, but he came down with influenza and was not much help. However, Bob Gracie started scoring and the Maroons almost nipped the Canadiens for first place in the Canadian Division.

Regular season

Highlights
The New York Americans had started in first place, but then their players came down with influenza and the team went downhill. But the worst blow was when Roy Worters suffered a hernia and had to retire. Alfie Moore and Lorne Chabot were not adequate replacements and the Amerks finished last in the Canadian Division.

On November 16, 1936, Hal Winkler made his NHL debut for the New York Rangers and gained a 1–0 shutout over the Montreal Maroons. He was the first goaltender to have a shutout in his NHL debut. The Montreal Canadiens had hit the bottom in 1935–36, and Babe Siebert was obtained to shore up the defence. But the most loved of all movements was buying Howie Morenz back from the Rangers. The Canadiens went from last to first in the Canadian Division. Morenz was just hitting his stride in January 1937, when tragedy struck. On one of his hurtling rushes, he was being checked by Earl Seibert of Chicago when his left skate got caught in the dasher of the end boards, and Morenz suffered a badly fractured leg. After suffering a nervous breakdown worrying about if he would be able to come back, more bad luck occurred. On March 8, 1937, X-rays revealed that Howie had blood clots in his healing leg. An operation was scheduled for the next day, but when Howie ate a light supper and told the nurse he wanted to rest, in falling asleep his pallor suddenly changed and the nurse knew something was wrong. A blood clot had stopped his heart, and attempts to revive Howie failed. News of Morenz's death shocked the hockey world, and thousands filed past his bier, many in tears, to pay their last respects.

Beyond Morenz's tragic mishap, it was an injury-filled year for many stars. Already suffering from a bad back, Boston's Eddie Shore suffered a broken vertebra that cost him the remainder of the season. Charlie Conacher of the Maple Leafs repeatedly injured his wrist, costing him much of the season, and was never the same player thereafter. A series of minor injuries precipitated Lionel Conacher's decision to retire at year's end, while Sylvio Mantha and Roy Worters suffered career-ending injuries. Other stars who missed several weeks of time or had season-ending injuries included Red Wings captain Doug Young, Larry Aurie, Russ Blinco, Buzz Boll, Pit Lepine, Dave Trottier, Toe Blake and Art Chapman.

With five games left to play, Chicago owner Frederic McLaughlin, a partisan of American-born players, decided to field an all-American lineup, the first time in major senior hockey that this was done. With incumbent Mike Karakas in goal, the Black Hawks signed Ernest Klingbeil and Paul Schaefer on defence, with a line of Milt Brink centering Al Suomi and Bun Laprairie. The team went 1–3 with the sextet in the lineup.

Detroit, led by Vezina Trophy winning Normie Smith, finished first in the American Division.

Final standings

Playoffs

Playoff bracket

Quarterfinals

(A2) Boston Bruins vs. (C2) Montreal Maroons

(C3) Toronto Maple Leafs vs. (A3) New York Rangers

Semifinals

(A1) Detroit Red Wings vs. (C1) Montreal Canadiens

(C2) Montreal Maroons vs. (A3) New York Rangers

Stanley Cup Finals

Awards
The "Rookie of the Year" award now had a trophy, the Calder Trophy, for the first time.

All-Star teams

Player statistics

Scoring leaders
Note: GP = Games played, G = Goals, A = Assists, PTS = Points, PIM = Penalties in minutes

Source: NHL

Coaches

American Division
Boston Bruins: Art Ross
Chicago Black Hawks: Clem Loughlin
Detroit Red Wings: Jack Adams
New York Rangers: Lester Patrick

Canadian Division
Montreal Canadiens: Cecil Hart
Montreal Maroons: Tommy Gorman
New York Americans: Red Dutton
Toronto Maple Leafs: Dick Irvin

Debuts
The following is a list of players of note who played their first NHL game in 1936–37 (listed with their first team, asterisk(*) marks debut in playoffs):
Bobby Bauer, Boston Bruins
Milt Schmidt, Boston Bruins
Clint Smith, New York Rangers
Bryan Hextall, New York Rangers
Syl Apps, Toronto Maple Leafs
Gordie Drillon, Toronto Maple Leafs
Turk Broda, Toronto Maple Leafs

Last games
The following is a list of players of note that played their last game in the NHL in 1936–37 (listed with their last team):
Bun Cook, Boston Bruins
Sylvio Mantha, Boston Bruins
Andy Blair, Chicago Black Hawks
Wildor Larochelle, Chicago Black Hawks
Howie Morenz, Montreal Canadiens
George Hainsworth, Montreal Canadiens
Lionel Conacher, Montreal Maroons
Alex Connell, Montreal Maroons
Baldy Cotton, New York Americans
Harry Oliver, New York Americans
Lorne Chabot, New York Americans
Roy Worters, New York Americans
Bill Cook, New York Rangers
Murray Murdoch, New York Rangers
King Clancy, Toronto Maple Leafs
Frank Finnigan, Toronto Maple Leafs

See also
1936-37 NHL transactions
List of Stanley Cup champions
1936 in sports
1937 in sports

References
 
 
 
 
 

Notes

External links
Hockey Database
NHL.com

 
1936–37 in Canadian ice hockey by league
1936–37 in American ice hockey by league